Busby, Clarkston and Eaglesham was one of six multi-member wards used to elect members of the East Renfrewshire Council between 2007 and 2017. It elected three Councillors.

As its name implies, the ward covered the suburban village of Busby and much of the suburban town of Clarkston (including the Carolside and Sheddens neighbourhoods) plus the village of Eaglesham, surrounded by an extensive rural hinterland including part of the developing Whitelee Wind Farm and the affluent hamlet of Waterfoot.

Prior to the 2017 Scottish local elections, arrangements across the country were subject to review, which concluded that East Renfrewshire's wards should be redrawn and the total number of representatives reduced from 20 to 18. Busby, Clarkston and Eaglesham was the ward which ceased to exist in this amendment, its territory divided between the Clarkston, Netherlee and Williamwood ward and the Newton Mearns South & Eaglesham ward.

Councillors

Election results

2012

2007

References

Wards of East Renfrewshire
Clarkston, East Renfrewshire
Eaglesham
2007 establishments in Scotland
2017 disestablishments in Scotland